Blasticorhinus is a genus of moths of the family Erebidae.

Selected species
Blasticorhinus aurantiaca (Holland, 1894)
Blasticorhinus bifasciata (Wileman, 1914)
Blasticorhinus cymasius Hampson, 1926
Blasticorhinus decernens (Walker, 1863) (Malaysia, Sulawesi)
Blasticorhinus discipuncta (Holland, 1894) (Gabon, Sierra Leone)
Blasticorhinus enervis (Swinhoe, 1890)
Blasticorhinus epixandus Rothschild, 1920
Blasticorhinus hampsoni (Bethune-Baker, 1906)
Blasticorhinus hoenei Berio, 1956
Blasticorhinus kanshireiensis (Wileman, 1914)
Blasticorhinus otophora (Hampson, 1894)
Blasticorhinus oxydata (Swinhoe, 1895)
Blasticorhinus rivulosa (Walker, 1865) (Japan, India)
Blasticorhinus trichopoda Hampson, 1926 (Cameroon, Ghana, Sierra Leone)
Blasticorhinus ussuriensis (Bremer, 1861) (Sibiria, Korea, Japan, China, Taiwan)
Blasticorhinus waelbroecki (Strand, 1918)

References
Natural History Museum Lepidoptera genus database
Blasticorhinus at Afro Moths

Calpinae